A niosome is a non-ionic surfactant-based vesicle. Niosomes are formed mostly by non-ionic surfactant and cholesterol incorporation as an excipient. They are structurally similar to liposomes as these are both composed of a lipid bilayer. Compared to liposomes they are more stable during the formation process and storage. They can entrap both hydrophilic and lipophilic drugs, either in an aqueous layer (for hydrophilic drugs) or in a vesicular membrane made of lipid material (for lipophilic drugs).

Structure 
Niosomes are microscopic lamellar structures. They consist of non-ionic surfactant from the alkyl or dialkyl polyglycerol ether class and cholesterol with subsequent hydration in aqueous media. The surfactant molecules tend to orient themselves in such a way that the hydrophilic ends of the non-ionic surfactant point outwards, while the hydrophobic ends face each other to form the bilayer.

Advantages of niosomes 
Niosomes offer several robust advantages for drug delivery systems. Niosomes are osmotically active, chemically stable, and have a long storage time compared to liposomes. Functional and chemical formation of the niosome-surface can be subjected to extensive modulation because the functional groups form their hydrophillic heads.

As a result of their non-ionic chemical bonding structures, niosomes offer high compatibility and low toxicity risk with biological systems. With their high degree of biocompatibility, they can serve as biodegradable and non-immunogenic drug delivery compounds. Niosomes can entrap lipophilic drugs into vesicular bilayer membranes. This function of bilayer membrane exchange can be applied to hydrophilic pharmaceuticals, entrapping their contents within aqueous compartments. By shielding the drug from the biological environment, niosomes can be useful in improving the therapeutic performance of various drug molecules. Niosomes can also be employed to more directly affect targeted cells and delay clearance from circulation within a sustained drug delivery system.

Methods of preparation 
Niosomes can be prepared by various methods, including:
 Ether injection method (EIM)
 Hand shaking method (HSM)
 Reverse phase evaporation method (REV)
 Trans-membrane pH gradient
 The "Bubble" method
 Microfluidization method
 Formation of niosomes from proniosomes (Proniosome Technology (PT))
 Thin-film hydration method (TFH)
 Heating method (HM)
 Freeze and thaw method (FAT)
 Dehydration rehydration method (DRM)

Applications 
Niosomes constitute a novel drug delivery system with useful applications, including:
 gene delivery
 drug targeting
 antineoplastic treatment
 leishmaniasis treatment
 delivery of peptide drugs
 studying immune response
 carriers for haemoglobin
 transdermal drug delivery systems
 cosmetics

References 

Membrane biology